The hoopoe-billed ʻakialoa, (Akialoa upupirostris), is an extinct species of Hawaiian honeycreeper. Subfossil remains have been found of this species in the Hawaiian islands of Kauai and Oahu. The species specific name, upupirostris, is derived from the Latin upupa, hoopoe, and rostrum, bill, and refers to the long sickle-shaped bill which resembles that of the hoopoe. The species was apparently slightly larger than others in its genus. A similar but smaller bird has been discovered but is as yet undescribed from the island of Maui. The species presumably became extinct after the arrival of humans in Hawaii, and is known only from the fossil record.

References

Hoopoe-billed
Extinct birds of Hawaii
Biota of Kauai
Biota of Oahu
Hoopoe-billed akialoa
Hoopoe-billed akialoa